The Madagascar women's national volleyball team represents Madagascar in international women's volleyball competitions and friendly matches.

Its best result was 3rd place at the 1989 Women's African Volleyball Championship.

References
 Madagascar Volleyball Federation

National women's volleyball teams
Volleyball
Volleyball in Madagascar
Women's sport in Madagascar